Gilbert Rattenbury (28 February 1878 – 14 August 1958) was a Welsh cricketer. He played for Gloucestershire between 1902 and 1909.

References

1878 births
1958 deaths
Welsh cricketers
Gloucestershire cricketers
Glamorgan cricketers
Cricketers from Cardiff